The 2005 Island Games were the 11th Island Games, and were held in Shetland, Scotland, from July 9 to July 15, 2005.

Medal table

Sports
The sports chosen for the games were:

External links
 Island Games 2005

 
Island Games
Island
Island
Sport in Shetland
International sports competitions hosted by Scotland
Multi-sport events in the United Kingdom
21st century in Shetland
July 2005 sports events in the United Kingdom